The Tampa Bay Rays are a Major League Baseball franchise based in St. Petersburg, Florida. The Rays (formerly the Tampa Bay Devil Rays) compete in the American League East division. Since the franchise was established in 1995, the Rays have selected 36 players in the first round. Officially known as the "First-Year Player Draft", the Rule 4 Draft is Major League Baseball's primary mechanism for assigning amateur baseball players from high schools, colleges, and other amateur baseball clubs to its teams. The draft order is determined based on the previous season's standings, with the team possessing the worst record receiving the first pick. In addition, teams which lost free agents in the previous off-season may be awarded compensatory or supplementary picks. The First-Year Player Draft is unrelated to the 1997 expansion draft in which the Rays filled their roster.

Of the 36 players the Rays have selected in the first round, 10 have been outfielders and 12 have been drafted exclusively as pitchers. Of the 12 pitchers, eight were right-handed and four were left-handed. The Rays have also drafted five shortstops, four third basemen, two catchers, one second baseman, and one first baseman. In addition to these, one player (2017 pick Brendan McKay) was drafted as both a left-handed pitcher and a first baseman. Twenty players were drafted out of high school, 12 were drafted out of four-year colleges, and one was drafted from a junior college. Two players were drafted from Rice University in Houston, Texas in consecutive years.

None of the Rays' first-round picks have won a World Series championship with the team, and no pick has been named the Most Valuable Player. Evan Longoria (2006) won the Rookie of the Year Award in 2008, the only Rays player to do so. The Rays have made the first selection in the draft four times, drafting Josh Hamilton (1999), Delmon Young (2003), David Price (2007), and Tim Beckham (2008).

The Rays have made nine selections in the supplemental round of the draft since their establishment in 1995. These additional picks are provided when a team loses a particularly valuable free agent in the previous off-season, or, more recently, if a team fails to sign a draft pick from the previous year. The Rays have failed to sign one of their first-round picks, LeVon Washington (2009), a client of Scott Boras who could not come to an agreed contract with the team. The Rays received the 31st pick in 2010 as compensation.

Key

Picks

See also
Tampa Bay Rays minor league players

Footnotes
 Through the 2012 draft, free agents were evaluated by the Elias Sports Bureau and rated "Type A", "Type B", or not compensation-eligible. If a team offered arbitration to a player but that player refused and subsequently signed with another team, the original team was able to receive additional draft picks. If a "Type A" free agent left in this way, his previous team received a supplemental pick and a compensatory pick from the team with which he signed. If a "Type B" free agent left in this way, his previous team received only a supplemental pick. Since the 2013 draft, free agents are no longer classified by type; instead, compensatory picks are only awarded if the team offered its free agent a contract worth at least the average of the 125 current richest MLB contracts. However, if the free agent's last team acquired the player in a trade during the last year of his contract, it is ineligible to receive compensatory picks for that player.
 The Rays lost their first-round pick in 1998 to the San Francisco Giants as compensation for signing free agent Roberto Hernández.
 Now known by his birth name of Melvin Upton Jr.
 The Rays gained a compensatory first-round pick in 2010 as compensation for not signing first-round draft pick LeVon Washington.
 The Rays gained a supplemental first-round pick in 2010 as for losing free agent Gregg Zaun.
 The Rays gained a compensatory first-round pick in 2011 from the Boston Red Sox for losing free agent Carl Crawford.
 The Rays gained a compensatory first-round pick in 2011 from the New York Yankees for losing free agent Rafael Soriano.
 The Rays gained a supplemental first-round pick in 2010 for losing free agent Rafael Soriano.
 The Rays gained a supplemental first-round pick in 2010 for losing free agent Carl Crawford.
 The Rays gained a supplemental first-round pick in 2010 for losing free agent Grant Balfour
 The Rays gained a supplemental first-round pick in 2010 for losing free agent Brad Hawpe.
 The Rays gained a supplemental first-round pick in 2010 for losing free agent Joaquín Benoit.
 The Rays gained a supplemental first-round pick in 2010 for losing free agent Randy Choate.
 The Rays gained a supplemental first-round pick in 2010 for losing free agent Chad Qualls.
 The Rays gained a compensatory first-round pick in 2013 for losing free agent B. J. Upton, now known as Melvin Upton Jr.

References

External links
Draft results from The Baseball Cube

First-round
Tampa Bay Rays